Satish Chandra Gupta (born 5 September 1951) is a former Indian cricket umpire. He stood in five ODI games between 1999 and 2002.

See also
 List of One Day International cricket umpires

References

1951 births
Living people
Indian One Day International cricket umpires
Place of birth missing (living people)